Seyed Hadi Mohaghegh (born 1979) is an Iranian film director and screenwriter.

Career
Born in Dehdasht, Iran, in 1979, Mohaghegh studied Automobile Mechanics. He began his artistic career in 1990 as a theatre actor and director, and in 2000 for television as an actor, designer and assistant director. In 2010, he started making films for television. In 2013, he made his first feature film Bardou which won Best Film, Best Director and Best Original Screenplay at the 2013 Isfahan IFF for Children and Young Adults. His second feature Immortal (2015), based on a story about an old woman but was adapted to that of an old man as showing of the female body is not permitted in Iran, won numerous awards at film festivals.

Filmography

Awards
2013 Isfahan Film Festival for Children and Young Adults: Best Director (Bardou)

References

External links
 
 

1979 births
Living people
Iranian film directors
Iranian screenwriters